The 2013 Georgia Rampage season was the second season for the professional indoor football franchise and second in the Ultimate Indoor Football League (UIFL). One of six teams that competed in the UIFL for the 2013 season.

Led by head coach Mark Bramblett, the Rampage played their home games at the Northwest Georgia Trade and Convention Center in Dalton, Georgia.

Schedule
Key:

Regular season
All start times are local to home team

Standings

y - clinched conference title
x - clinched playoff spot

Roster

References

Georgia Rampage
Georgia Rampage
American football in Georgia (U.S. state)